Aleksandar Radunović (Serbian Cyrillic: Александар Радуновић; born 9 May 1980) is a Serbian former footballer who serves as an assistant coach at Polish club Piast Gliwice.

Beside his home clubs FK Radnički Beograd and FK Budućnost Valjevo, Radunović previously played for ŁKS Łódź in the Polish Ekstraklasa. and also with Korona Kielce.

References

External links
 Aleksandar Radunović Stats at Utakmica.rs

1980 births
Living people
People from Novi Bečej
Serbian footballers
FK Radnički Beograd players
FK Budućnost Valjevo players
Korona Kielce players
ŁKS Łódź players
FK BSK Borča players
FK Radnički Šid players
Serbian SuperLiga players
I liga players
Expatriate footballers in Poland
Association football defenders
Serbian expatriate footballers
Serbian expatriate sportspeople in Poland